Hasisar railway station is located in Sindh, Pakistan.

See also
 List of railway stations in Pakistan
 Pakistan Railways

References

External links

Railway stations in Sindh
Railway stations on Hyderabad–Khokhrapar Branch Line